The Book of Matt is a book by Stephen Jimenez.  Published by Steerforth in 2013, the book is an investigation into the murder of Matthew Shepard.  It concludes that the crime was not a hate crime based on Shepherd's sexual orientation, but that he was a methamphetamine dealer who knew his killers, and it was a drug transaction gone awry.

Reviews 
In The Nation, JoAnn Wypijewski praised the book, noting that "Jimenez does not polemicize or tread deeply into the psyches of the main figures. Rather, he explores the drug-fueled world they inhabited, and evokes its thick air of violence."
James Kirchick in The Wall Street Journal stated that the book reads more like a "Mountain West Rashomon than a conclusive journalistic brief," and concluded that "we will likely never know what truly transpired on that evil Wyoming night."  Andrew Gumbel, in The Guardian, noted that "Jimenez is also careful to point out that his goal is understand Shepard as a complex human being and make the fullest possible sense of his murder, not to suggest in any way that he deserved his horrific fate. 'We have enshrined Matthew’s tragedy as passion play and folktale,' he writes, 'but hardly ever for the truth of what it was, or who he was – much to our own diminishment.'

Culture critic Alyssa Rosenberg criticized the book for being poorly sourced, stating: "by not distinguishing which quotations are manufactured from recollections, which are paraphrases recounted by sources, and which were spoken directly to him", and countered most of the major aspects of the book. For example, she disputed claims about Shepard's alleged drug dealing, as most of the sources remained suspect or otherwise unsubstantiated. "Jimenez never qualifies how credible the sources are, or validates their closeness to Shepard, or evaluates the potential motivations for their accounts", she wrote.

Some police officials interviewed after Jimenez's book's publication disputed certain claims made in the book. Dave O'Malley, the Laramie police commander over the investigations division at the time of Shepard's murder, said Jimenez's claim that Shepard was "a methamphetamine kingpin is almost humorous. Someone that would buy into that certainly would believe almost anything they read." Other police, such as the officer who found the murder weapon, believed it was a drug-related killing. 

Rob Debree, lead sheriff's investigator at the time, said the book contains "factual errors and lies", and deemed Jimenez's claim that Shepard was a drug dealer "truly laughable".

References

External links
 Steerforth Press

2013 non-fiction books
American non-fiction books
English-language books
Historiography of LGBT in the United States
Non-fiction crime books
LGBT-related controversies in literature